Marlin Ikenberry is an American baseball coach and former catcher, who is the current head baseball coach of the James Madison Dukes. He played college baseball at VMI for coach Chris Finwood from 1992 to 1995. He served at head coach of the VMI Keydets for 11 seasons, from 2004 to 2014. He was hired on July 22, 2003, the successor to Tom Slater, who departed for a coaching position at the University of Florida. Ikenberry resigned the position to after the 2014 season to pursue a business opportunity.

Ikenberry is a 1995 graduate of VMI. He is the Keydets' winningest head baseball coach, as well as the program's longest tenured head coach. He had a career coaching record of 282–307–1 (.475) in his eleven seasons at VMI.

Playing career
As a cadet at VMI, Ikenberry played catcher and started all 4 years. He caught for former major league pitcher Ryan Glynn who played for the Texas Rangers, Toronto Blue Jays, and Oakland Athletics. He was a part of both the 1993 team, which made the Southern Conference tournament finals, and the 1994 team, who finished third in the conference and set a then-school record for wins in a season. He graduated in 1995.

Coaching career

William & Mary
Ikenberry spent three years at the College of William and Mary as an assistant coach and recruiting coordinator in the late 1990s. In his final season with the Tribe, William & Mary went on to win a CAA title as well as a berth in the NCAA tournament. Ikenberry coached major leaguers Brendan Harris and Chris Ray.

VMI
Ikenberry was initially hired as VMI's recruiting coordinator in 2000, as well as a pitching and catching coach. He was later hired in 2003 as a head coach. After two losing seasons in 2004 and 2005, VMI went 30–25 in 2006, which was the program's first winning season since 1965, a drought of over 40 years. Ikenberry also led the Keydets to winning campaigns in 2007 and 2008, marking the first streak of three straight winning seasons for VMI baseball since 1954 to 1956 (which was the only other occasion). Ikenberry coached automobile dealership mogul, Miles McQuaig. Ikenberry garnered six winning seasons, the same amount the program had in its history before Ikenberry's tenure. He resigned to take on a business opportunity with ARMS software.

James Madison
Ikenberry was named the head coach of James Madison's baseball team on June 30, 2015. He led the Dukes to a 26–26 record in 2018, the team's best finish since 2011.

Head coaching record

Personal life
Ikenberry was born in Richmond, Virginia. His twin brother Merlin and elder brother Steve were both graduates of VMI; Merlin was also a teammate of Marlin's, and they were commonly known as the Fish and the Wizard. Ikenberry is married to his wife Shannon and they have two sons, Owen and Gavin. Merlin (Marlins brother) is married to Tracey and they have three kids named Annabel, Kyla, and Levi.

References

1973 births
Living people
Ikenberry
Ikenberry
Ikenberry
Ikenberry
Baseball players from Richmond, Virginia
Baseball coaches from Virginia